The Gary, Indiana mayoral election of 1967 saw the election of Richard G. Hatcher.

This was, along with Cleveland, Ohio's coinciding election, the first election of an African American as mayor of an American city with a population over 100,000. Hatcher would also become the first African American mayor in the state of Indiana.

Nominations
Primaries were held on May 2.

Democratic primary
Hatcher unseated incumbent mayor A. Martin Katz in the Democratic Party primary.

Republican primary

General election
Usually, in the heavily-Democratic city, winning the Democratic nomination was tantamount to election. However the race was much closer in 1967 due to intense racial politics and the Democratic machine's anger over Hatcher's nomination, being a reformer. Although Republicans had given up on seriously contesting elections in Gary in the 1940s, it was believed that white voters in Gary had shown they were willing to abandon the Democratic Party if they believed that Democratic politicians were too accommodating to black voters when George Wallace performed well there in the 1964 Democratic Presidential primary (in which he challenged incumbent Democratic president Lyndon B. Johnson); hence, when Richard Hatcher was the Democratic nominee for mayor in the 1967 election, the election was bitterly fought between Hatcher and the Republican nominee Joseph B. Radigan.

Due to the intense racial divide and the desire of white ethnic Democrats to maintain their grip on power over the city's Democratic machine and patronage system, prominent Democrats in the county machine (including the chairman of the Lake County Democratic Party) endorsed Republican Joe Radigan and worked to purge black voters from voter registration rolls and replace them with non-existent white voters, smashed voting machines in black-majority precincts, and employing white police officers to intimidate black voters from entering voting stations. 

While Black Americans made up 53% of Gary's population, white residents had an edge in voter registration. Hatcher was able to overcome this and win the election by over 2,000 votes by winning 96% of the black vote in addition to 12% of the white vote.

References

Local elections in Indiana
Gary mayoral
Gary, Indiana
November 1967 events in the United States
History of Gary, Indiana